= Bhasot =

Basot is a village in Bhikiasain, Uttarakhand, Uttarakhand, India.
